The 2006–07 Elite Ice Hockey League season commenced on September 9, 2006 and concluded on April 8, 2007. It was the Elite League's fourth season of competition.

There was a reduction of one in the number of foreign trained players ('imports') a club was allowed to have signed at one time, with a limit of ten per team. The number of players requiring a work permit (non-British and European Union citizens) was increased from five to nine.

Clubs also had a greater number of North American players to choose from. Previously, EIHL teams were only able to sign players who had played in the NHL, AHL and ECHL, something which essentially limited EIHL clubs to a small pool of ECHL players and inflated wage demands. These new rules allowed clubs to sign players from the CHL and the UHL.

The Nottingham Panthers represented the United Kingdom in the 2006–07 Continental Cup because the 2005–06 champions Belfast Giants and runner-up Newcastle Vipers declined to take part in the tournament.

Notable events
With planning permission granted for a new rink, the Manchester Phoenix entered a team into competitions for the first time since 2003–04. While waiting for the Altrincham Ice Dome to be completed, the Phoenix played home matches at the Deeside Leisure Centre and at IceSheffield. After numerous delays the Ice Dome finally opened on February 25, 2007 with a 5–4 defeat to the Basingstoke Bison.
The Hull Stingrays were elected to join the Elite League from the second tier English Premier League. This brought the number of actively participating members in British ice hockey's top flight to ten, the highest number since 1995–96.
The Cardiff Devils moved to a new ice rink in Cardiff Bay. After playing on the road for the first three months of the season, the Devils played their first game at the Cardiff Bay Ice Rink on December 6, 2006 with a 7–4 victory over Manchester. Despite their difficulties, the Devils won the Knockout Cup with a 3–0 victory over Coventry Blaze in the final at the SkyDome.
The Coventry Blaze won their second league title in three seasons, confirming the championship with a 5–1 victory over the Edinburgh Capitals on March 21, 2007 with two games to spare. The Blaze also won a second Challenge Cup with a 9-4 aggregate victory over the Sheffield Steelers in the final.
The Nottingham Panthers clinched their first Play-off Championship since 1989 with a penalty shots win over the Cardiff Devils. The Panthers won each round of the playoffs on penalty shots, defeating their arch rivals Sheffield in the quarterfinals and the Belfast Giants in the semifinals before claiming the trophy on April 8, 2007.

Challenge Cup

The preliminary round saw Coventry, Hull, Manchester and Sheffield advance to the semifinals. Coventry were drawn to face Manchester and Hull drawn against Sheffield.

Semifinals

Final

Elite League Table
{| class="wikitable"
! width="40%" | Regular season standings
! width="5%" | GP
! width="5%" | W
! width="5%" | OTW
! width="5%" | L
! width="5%" | OTL
! width="7.5%" | GF
! width="7.5%" | GA
! width="7.5%" | Pts
|- align=center bgcolor="#FFBF00"
|align=left| Coventry Blaze || 54 || 31 || 5 || 15 || 3 || 188 || 129 || 75
|- align=center bgcolor="#CCFFCC"
|align=left| Belfast Giants || 54 || 27 || 7 || 17 || 3 || 192 || 153 || 71
|- align=center bgcolor="#CCFFCC"
|align=left| Cardiff Devils || 54 || 22 || 10 || 17 || 5 || 175 || 152 || 69
|- align=center bgcolor="#CCFFCC"
|align=left| Sheffield Steelers || 54 || 26 || 4 || 16 || 8 || 163 || 154 || 68
|- align=center bgcolor="#CCFFCC"
|align=left| Nottingham Panthers || 54 || 25 || 4 || 17 || 8 || 184 || 149 || 66
|- align=center bgcolor="#CCFFCC"
|align=left| Manchester Phoenix || 54 || 21 || 5 || 22 || 6 || 185 || 184 || 58
|- align=center bgcolor="#CCFFCC"
|align=left| Basingstoke Bison || 54 || 21 || 2 || 25 || 6 || 161 || 185 || 52
|- align=center bgcolor="#CCFFCC"
|align=left| Newcastle Vipers || 54 || 22 || 2 || 29 || 1 || 151 || 169 || 49
|- align=center
|align=left| Hull Stingrays || 54 || 15 || 3 || 33 || 3 || 114 || 174 || 39
|- align=center
|align=left| Edinburgh Capitals || 54 || 14 || 4 || 33 || 3 || 160 || 224 || 39
|}

Elite League play-offs

Quarter-finals

Quarter Final 1: (1) Coventry Blaze vs. (8) Newcastle Vipers

Quarter Final 2: (2) Belfast Giants vs. (7) Basingstoke Bison

Quarter Final 3: (3) Cardiff Devils vs. (6) Manchester Phoenix

Quarter Final 4: (4) Sheffield Steelers vs. (5) Nottingham Panthers

Semifinals

Semifinal 1: (1) Coventry Blaze vs. (3) Cardiff Devils

Semifinal 2: (2) Belfast Giants vs. (5) Nottingham Panthers

Grand final

(3) Cardiff Devils vs. (5) Nottingham Panthers

Awards
Coach of the Year Trophy – Paul Thompson, Coventry Blaze
Player of the Year Trophy – Mark Smith, Cardiff Devils
Ice Hockey Annual Trophy – Tony Hand, Manchester Phoenix
British Netminder of the Year – Stephen Murphy, Edinburgh Capitals
Alan Weeks Trophy – Jonathan Weaver, Newcastle Vipers
Best British Forward – Tony Hand, Manchester Phoenix

All Star teams

References
Ice Hockey Journalists UK
Malcolm Preen's Ice Hockey Results and Tables

Elite Ice Hockey League seasons
1
United